Tashi Namgyal (Wylie: Bkra-shis Rnam-rgyal) (26 October 1893 – 2 December 1963) was the ruling Chogyal (King) of Sikkim from 1914 to 1963. He was the son of Thutob Namgyal. He was the first independent king of Sikkim.

Biography
Namgyal was the 11th ruler of the Namgyal dynasty of Sikkim, succeeding his half brother Sidkeong Tulku Namgyal, who had ruled from February to December 1914 - when he died, suddenly, under mysterious circumstances. Born in Tibet and crowned by the 13th Dalai Lama, Thubten Gyatso, he was a strong advocate for closer links with India.

He was educated in St. Paul's School, Darjeeling. He was married in October 1918 to Kunzang Dechen, and they had 3 sons and 3 daughters. The eldest son died in a plane crash during World War Two. On his death he was succeeded as Chogyal by his second son Palden Thondup Namgyal.

During his reign, he was known for land reform and free elections.  He also favoured closer links between Sikkim, India and Tibet. Many people attribute his death to Indian agents.

About a decade after his death, his son Palden Thondup Namgyal, the incumbent hereditary Chogyal, was formally deposed. Prime Minister Lendup Dorji appealed to India to change the status of Sikkim from protectorate to statehood. On 16 May 1975, Sikkim was officially made the 22nd state of India.

Titles and honours
1893–1914: Prince Tashi Namgyal
1914–1923: His Highness Sri Panch Maharaja Tashi Namgyal, Maharaja Chogyal of Sikkim
1923–1963: His Highness Sri Panch Maharaja Sir Tashi Namgyal, Maharaja Chogyal of Sikkim

Delhi Durbar Medal, 11 December 1911.
CIE: Companion of the Order of the Indian Empire, 1 January 1918.
KCIE: Knight Commander of the Order of the Indian Empire, 1 January 1923.
King George V Silver Jubilee Medal, 6 May 1935.
King George VI Coronation Medal, 12 May 1937.
KCSI: Knight Commander of the Order of the Star of India, 8 June 1939.

Ancestry

See also
Tashi Namgyal Academy

References

 
 
  

Monarchs of Sikkim
1893 births
1963 deaths
Knights Commander of the Order of the Star of India
Knights Commander of the Order of the Indian Empire
St. Paul's School, Darjeeling alumni